Sameleh-ye Sofla (also Romanized as Sāmeleh-ye Soflá; also known as Sāmeleh) is a village in Sar Firuzabad Rural District, Firuzabad District, Kermanshah County, Kermanshah Province, Iran. At the 2006 census, its population was 309, in 66 families.

References 

Populated places in Kermanshah County